Materiality can refer to distinct concepts in different professions and areas of study:

Materiality (architecture)
Materiality (auditing), relating to the importance of an amount, transaction, or discrepancy
Materiality (digital text), refers to the physical medium used to store and convey the text
Materiality (law), a legal term that has different meanings depending on context
Materiality (social sciences and humanities), the notion that the physical properties of a cultural artifact have consequences for how the object is used
Materiality (sustainability), defines a method for analysing the alignment of a business and their stakeholders and prioritising issues that matter the most

See also
 Material (disambiguation)
Materialization (disambiguation)